Aleksander Kask (21 August 1902 – 31 March 1965) was an Estonian weightlifter. He competed in the men's featherweight event at the 1928 Summer Olympics.

References

External links
 

1902 births
1965 deaths
Estonian male weightlifters
Olympic weightlifters of Estonia
Weightlifters at the 1928 Summer Olympics
People from Sindi, Estonia